East Millsboro is an unincorporated community in Fayette County, Pennsylvania, United States. The community is located on the east bank of the Monongahela River, across from Millsboro. East Millsboro has a post office with the ZIP code 15433.

References

Unincorporated communities in Fayette County, Pennsylvania
Unincorporated communities in Pennsylvania